The Gatun Dam is a large earthen dam across the Chagres River in Panama, near the town of Gatun. The dam, constructed between 1907 and 1913, is a crucial element of the Panama Canal; it impounds the artificial Gatun Lake, which in turn carries ships  of their transit across the Isthmus of Panama. In addition, a hydro-electric generating station at the dam generates electricity which is used to operate the locks and other equipment in the canal.

Construction of the dam was a great engineering achievement, eclipsed only by the parallel excavation of the Culebra Cut; at the time of completion, the dam was the largest earth dam in the world, and Gatun Lake was the largest artificial lake in the world.

Description 

The spillway for the dam is constructed on the central hill; it consists of a semi-circular concrete dam, which regulates the flow of water down a concrete channel built into the back slope of the hill. The spillway is designed so that water pouring over the semi-circular dam converges at the bottom from opposite directions and neutralises its own force, thus minimising erosion below.

Power generation 

The dam incorporates a hydro-electric generating station, which is situated on the east side of the spillway discharge channel. The power generated is used for the operation of the lock and spillway machinery, and for the lighting of the locks and the canal villages.

Construction 

The canal effort was begun by a French company (La Compagnie Universelle du Canal Interoceanique) in 1880 to 1889. With poor exploration of the options and with poor information of the costs, the French company planned to construct a sea-level canal linking the two coasts. They initially thought they could do this for about $120 million. After spending about one billion Francs (about $300,000,000), losing about 22,000 workers and going bankrupt, the French effort essentially ceased. A sea level canal would not have required the dam to be built but would have still required extensive provisions made to accommodate the ever-changing Chagres River flow. Almost two years were spent in infra-structure preparation, mosquito abatement (the newly discovered vector spreading Yellow fever and Malaria), Panama Railroad improvements, and planning before the work got up to full speed. After reviewing the options and costs, in 1906 a lock-based canal was decided upon and agreed to by President Theodore Roosevelt.

Even before the lock canal decision was made, Major George Washington Goethals (United States Army Corps of Engineers), the chief engineer from 1907 to 1914 of the construction effort, had already carried out an investigation under John Frank Stevens (chief engineer, 1905–1907) into determining the suitability of the land at Gatun for the building of a large dam there. Extensive test borings were made to determine the suitability of the land, and pressure tests were carried out on the material to be used in construction to determine its durability.

The Gatun Dam serves two important purposes: it controls the ever varying Chagres River and creates Gatun Lake.  The lake at about  elevation provides an elevated path for ships across most of the Isthmus of Panama including through the treacherous V shaped Culebra Cut (Gaillard Cut). This saved excavating literally millions of cubic yards of material that would have been necessary for a sea level canal.  The lake height is regulated by spillways that control the water flow out of the dam to obtain an almost constant height in wet or dry seasons. The lake also acts as a massive reservoir to work the locks on both the Pacific Ocean and Atlantic Ocean ends of the canal and provides via hydro-electric generators about 6 MW of electrical power needed to run the locks and dam. After finishing the dam and filling Gatun Lake it was dredged where necessary to obtain a clear ship channel across the lake.

The Gatun location was in most ways ideal for a dam; upstream of the dam site the hills enclosing the Chagres River opened very wide around the area that is now Gatun Lake. Over a narrow gap the hills close to a relatively narrow gap with a natural rock-based channel in the centre. This allows a moderately sized dam to enclose a huge body of water, which both provides passage for ships across much of the isthmus, and provides a reservoir of water with which to operate the locks. The central hill was the ideal solid base for the construction of the concrete spillway and its dam, the main part of the dam being earth. Between these waste rock walls an impervious core was created by using a hydraulic fill technique which pumped millions of cubic yards of clay material and water into the area between the rock walls. This fill was made by digging up the soft clay present in the valley below, where dredges excavated the clay and water and loaded it into pumps that delivered it up into a pond created between the inner and outer walls of the dam. The pumped mixture was allowed to sit until the clay settled out, with the excess water being drawn off and pumped back downstream. This dried and hardened material created a solid core of "natural" cement at the core of the dam.

After the dam was built to its desired height, the entire up-stream side was armored to prevent wave action damaging the dam by placing large boulders on the face, particularly where there is strong wave action.

Water level
After the opening of the Panama Canal, it was found that the water level impounded by the dam did not stay constant enough during the dry season for the operation of the canal. The Madden Dam was constructed much higher up the Chagres River to provide a reservoir and hydroelectric power for Panama City, opening in 1935.

See also

 List of power stations in Panama

Notes

References 
 History Of The Panama Canal, by Ira E. Bennett
 The Panama Canal, by Colonel George W. Goethals

Dams completed in 1913
Energy infrastructure completed in 1913
Panama Canal
Dams in Panama
Hydroelectric power stations in Panama
Buildings and structures in Colón Province
1913 establishments in Panama

de:Gatúnsee